Gian Carlo Di Martino Tarquinio is a Venezuelan politician and lawyer who is a former mayor of the city of Maracaibo, Venezuela's second largest city.

Biography
Di Martino was born on July 12, 1964, in Maracaibo, the son of Italian immigrants. He received a bachelor's degree in political sciences at the Rafael Urdaneta University in 1987. In 1991, he received a diploma in international diplomacy from the Central University of Venezuela. In 1993, he graduated as a lawyer at the Andrés Bello Catholic University in Caracas.

In 1997, he was director of the Sabaneta jail in Maracaibo and general director of the foreign affairs office of Zulia. Two years later, he became alderman of the city.

In 2000, he was elected mayor of Maracaibo and was re-elected in 2004.

Di Martino became a member of the PSUV and ran for governor of Zulia in the regional elections on 23 November 2008. He was defeated by Pablo Pérez of A New Era.

Personal life
Di Martino is married to Ana Clara Barboza, president of the Fundacion Niños del Sol. They have five children.

References

1964 births
Living people
People from Maracaibo
Venezuelan people of Italian descent
Central University of Venezuela alumni
Mayors of places in Venezuela
United Socialist Party of Venezuela politicians
Andrés Bello Catholic University alumni